On 23 January 1974 on the Berwyn Mountains in Llandrillo, Merionethshire, Wales, lights and noises were observed that were alleged to be related to a UFO sighting on Cadair Berwyn and Cadair Bronwen. Scientific evidence indicated that the event was generated by an earthquake combined with sightings of a bright meteor widely observed over Wales and northern England at the time.

History 
On the evening of 23 January 1974, residents of the Berwyn Mountains area in northern Wales reported a loud noise and a bright light in the sky. When UFOlogists claimed that a UFO crashed and the British Government covered up the military's recovery of a crashed spaceship, some tabloid newspapers jokingly labelled it "The Roswelsh Incident".

Scientific evidence indicates the event was generated by an earthquake combined with sightings of a bright meteor widely observed over Wales and Northern England at the time.

Declassified Ministry of Defence documents also suggest the incident was caused by the combined effects of an earthquake and a meteor. The Institute of Geological Sciences (now British Geological Survey) reported that a magnitude 3.5 earthquake was felt at 8:38 p.m. that night over a wide area of northern Wales and as far as Formby in England - 13 miles north of Liverpool. It was not immediately identified as an earthquake, hence the police investigation. However, the magnitude of the shock was such that had it been due to an aircraft crash, the resulting crater would have been large enough to be easily visible. The unusual lights reported may have been simply the meteor, but may also have included the phenomenon known as earthquake light.

In popular culture 
The incident was the subject of a segment on BBC1's The One Show on 2 March 2021.

A 2017 episode of Ancient Aliens speculated that a UFO crashed at Berwyn and its wreckage was likely taken to Rudloe Manor.

See also
UFO sightings in the United Kingdom

References

External links 
MOD response to this incident
Listing National Archive records AIR 2/18873 and AIR 2/18874 relating to this event
Richard D. Hall documentary including local exploration and interviews

1974 in Wales
Conspiracy theories in the United Kingdom
UFO sightings in Wales
January 1974 events in the United Kingdom